Kosmos 117 ( meaning Cosmos 117) or Zenit-2 No.39 was a Soviet optical film-return reconnaissance satellite launched in 1966.

Kosmos 117 was launched by a Vostok-2 rocket, serial number N15001-01, flying from Site 31/6 at the Baikonur Cosmodrome. The launch took place at 11:02 GMT on 6 May 1966, and following its successful arrival in orbit the spacecraft received its Kosmos designation; along with the International Designator 1966-037A and the Satellite Catalog Number 02163.

After eight days in orbit, Kosmos 117 was deorbited, with its return capsule descending under parachute and landing at 08:24 GMT on 14 May 1966 and recovered by Soviet force.

References

Kosmos satellites
Spacecraft launched in 1966
Spacecraft which reentered in 1966
Zenit-2 satellites
1966 in the Soviet Union